Nagavalli is a 2010 Indian Telugu-language comedy horror film written and directed by P. Vasu. It is produced by Bellamkonda Suresh on Sri Sai Ganesh Productions. The film stars Venkatesh, Anushka Shetty, Kamalinee Mukherjee and Richa Gangopadhyay. It has music composed by Gurukiran. The film is a remake of director's own 2010 Kannada film Aptharakshaka and serves as a standalone sequel to the Tamil film Chandramukhi (2005).

Plot
An ancient painting of Chandramukhi, alias Nagavalli, is distributed as a prize to Bharatanatyam dancer Gayathri, her husband, and her family. Gayathri lives in Tirupathi with her husband, father Shankar Rao, mother Parvathi, sisters Geetha who tries to repaint the original portrait of Chandramukhi as a part of her painting hobby, and Gowri, maternal uncle Appa Rao, his wife, and maternal cousins Pooja and Hema.

A few years later, Gayathri and her husband are shown to be dead. Gowri, the youngest of the three sisters is engaged to be married and on the day of the wedding, one of her friends faints upon encountering a huge snake, and the bridegroom calls off the wedding after fearing something. The members of the family are affected by the presence of Chandramukhi's painting. so they contact Acharya Ramchandra Siddhanthi. The Acharya takes the help of Dr. Vijay, a psychiatrist, and assistant to Dr. Eshwar to solve the problem. All directions point to the portrait of Chandramukhi to be the cause of the problems in the Rao household. The Acharya says that it is the same painting that has resurfaced from another house, where Vijay's mentor Dr.Eshwar, and the Acharya had first come across this problem and solved it five years ago. One night, Dr. Vijay goes to the outhouse as he hears anklet sounds and finds that Gayathri is still alive but became mentally disturbed after the accident in which her husband died. It is revealed that the family decided to hide Gayathri from the public, fearing that Geetha and Gowri would not get prospective suitors for marriage. Suspecting that Gayathri is the one possessed by Chandramukhi, the Rao family along with Vijay and the Acharya, take her to a nearby temple where they find strange paranormal occurrences but fail to exorcise her.

Vijay starts to investigate the history of Chandramukhi. It takes him back to around 125 years when a king, Raja Sri Sri Sri Nagabhairava Rajshekhara had chanced upon a beautiful dancer Chandramukhi, also known as Nagavalli. Vijay learns that it was Nagabhairava who usurped wealth and kidnapped Chandramukhi from a Tamil kingdom and not his brother Venkatapathy Rajashekara as believed by many. Nagabhairava is smitten by Chandramukhi, but before he could do anything about it, he finds her with her lover Gunasekar and in a fit of rage, kills them both. He also orders that any virgin woman in his kingdom should be exiled or he would kill them. But his subordinates and the people of his kingdom gather against Nagabhairava and plot to assassinate him for all his wrongdoings. Nagabhairava escapes and no one knew if he is still alive or dead. Vijay also finds that someone else is also investigating the history of Chandramukhi simultaneously and gets to know that it could be the woman that is possessed by Chandramukhi.

Vijay finds that Nagabhairava is still alive with his astrological profile and deduces that he could live like a sage using black magic. His assumptions are right when he finds the old & crumpled Raja is alive in a cave. Meanwhile, the Acharya still believes that Gayathri is the possessed woman and tries to exorcise her with pooja and mantras. Vijay tells that she isn't possessed but is just mentally disturbed and cures her post-traumatic disorder successfully and reveals to everyone that Gowri is the one affected by Chandramukhi and proves it. They find that Gowri was in a fragile mental state due to Gayathri's trauma and a close friend's death and did research about people who live longer than normal when she came across the legend of Chandramukhi and Nagabhairava and empathizes with their story. She tries to learn more about Chandramukhi and Gunasekar and eventually gets a personality disorder, also called possession by Chandramukhi. Vijay tells a possessed Gowri that Nagabhairava is still alive and sees her transforming into a rage-filled Chandramukhi. She goes to the cave to kill Nagabhairava. Vijay follows her where they have a battle with him, and as Nagabhairava uses his sword to behead Chandramukhi, a bolt of lightning strikes the sword, and it reduces him to ashes. Chandramukhi leaves Gowri as she has sought her revenge and finally everyone is at peace.

Cast

Soundtrack

Music composed by Guru Kiran. Lyrics written by Chandrabose. Music released on Aditya Music Company. Nagavallis soundtrack was released on 16 November 2010 at Shilpakala Vedika, Hyderabad. The audio launch was attended by D. Ramanaidu, Rajamouli, Puri Jagannadh, VV Vinayak, Rana, Nani, Ileana, Praneetha, KL Narayana and other film celebrities, along with Nagavalli'''s cast and crew. Tunes were retained from Kannada for the songs Ghirani Ghirani and Omkara.

ReceptionNagavalli Received mixed reviews from critics and audience.

123telugu.com gave a review of rating 3/5 stating "If Nagavalli can be watched separately from Chandramukhi it is a very entertaining Telugu movie. It's got the right mix of elements, and will be a treat for Venkatesh's fans." Greatandhra.com gave a review of rating 3.25/5 stating "The story line of Chandramukhi that is well known for almost all the Telugu audience continues with 'Nagavalli'. It's a perfect sequel that way. It is more thrilling and suspense filled. Although the treatment resembles something on the lines of Krishna's old film Ave Kallu', this proves to be interesting and gripping till the end." idlebrain.com gave a review of rating 3/5 stating "The plus points of the film are Venkatesh and Chandramukhi's premise. On the flip side, a better screenplay and an exciting climax would have helped the movie. We have to wait and see how the crowds respond to this sequel to Chandramukhi." IndiaGlitz gave a review stating "Aura Aura Nagavalli is no match to Laka Laka Laka Laka Chandramukhi, But if you are a fan of Venkatesh and wish to see a beautiful Anushka portrayed more splendidly than ever, don't miss this movie." Oneindia Entertainment gave a review stating "The first half of the film is just okay while the second half is gripping. Though the film has given the feel of rehashing the Chandramukhi film, the way the director etched each and every character needs to be complimented."

Box officeNagavalli'' collected more than 10 Crores in its opening week.

References

External links 

Indian comedy horror films
Telugu remakes of Kannada films
Films scored by Gurukiran
Films directed by P. Vasu
2010s Telugu-language films
Indian horror film remakes
Films about dissociative identity disorder
Indian sequel films
2010 comedy horror films
2010 films